Juhani is a common Finnish male given name and Arabic surname.

Given name
 Juhani Aaltonen (born 1935), Finnish jazz saxophonist and flautist
 Juhani Aho
 Juhani Kaskeala
 Juhani Komulainen
 Juhani Kumpulainen
 Juhani Lahtinen
 Juhani "Juice" Leskinen (1950–2006), Finnish musician 
 Juhani Ojala
 Juhani Pallasmaa
 Juhani Peltonen
 Juhani Suutarinen
 Juhani Tamminen
 Juhani Tamminen (ice hockey, born 1989) 
 Juhani Wahlsten

Surname
 Khalid al-Juhani, Saudi al-Qaeda member
 Ma'bad al-Juhani, Islamic figure

Fictional characters
Juhani (Star Wars), a female playable character featured in Star Wars: Knights of the Old Republic.
Juhani Otso Berg, a major antagonist in the modern day plotline of the Assassin's Creed series.

Arabic-language surnames
Finnish masculine given names